The Hunter 430 is an American sailboat that was designed by the Hunter Design Team as a cruising boat and first built in 1995.

The Hunter 430 is a development of the Hunter 43 Legend, using a similar hull, but different interior arrangement.

Production
The design was built by Hunter Marine in the United States between 1995 and 2000. During its production run 415 examples were completed, but it is now out of production.

Design
The Hunter 430 is a recreational keelboat, built predominantly of fiberglass. It has a fractional sloop B&R rig, a raked stem, a walk-through reverse transom with a swimming platform and a folding ladder, an internally mounted spade-type rudder controlled by a wheel and a fixed wing keel. It displaces  and carries  of ballast.

There are also two  waster water holding tanks.

Factory standard equipment included a 110% roller furling genoa, a fiberglass mainsheet arch, three two-speed self tailing winches, marine VHF radio, knotmeter, depth sounder, AM/FM radio and CD player with eight speakers, dual anchor rollers, hot and cold water cockpit shower, two fully enclosed heads with showers, private forward and aft cabins, a dinette table that converts to a berth, microwave oven, refrigerator and separate freezer,  dual stainless steel sinks and a three-burner gimbaled propane stove and oven. Factory options included a mainsheet traveler, a double aft cabin, air conditioning, mast furling mainsail, electric anchor winch and a leather interior.

The design has a PHRF racing average handicap of 99 with a high of 111 and low of 96.

See also
List of sailing boat types

Related development
Hunter 43 Legend

Similar sailboats
C&C 43-1
C&C 43-2
Hunter 420
Hunter 426

References

External links
Official brochure

Keelboats
1990s sailboat type designs
Sailing yachts
Sailboat type designs by Hunter Design Team
Sailboat types built by Hunter Marine